Royal Air Force Worksop or more simply RAF Worksop was a former Royal Air Force station located at Scofton,  north east of Worksop, Nottinghamshire and  west of Retford, Nottinghamshire, England.

Station history

 No. 18 Operational Training Unit RAF between November 1943 and 1945 with various aircraft including Miles Martinets, Airspeed Oxfords, Curtiss P-40 Curtiss Tomahawks and Vickers Wellingtons
 No 1 Engine Control and Demonstration Unit RAF
 No 1 Group Communication Flight RAF
 No. 4 Flying Training School RAF
 No. 211 Advanced Flying School RAF was renamed to No. 211 Flying Training School RAF in June 1954
 No. 616 Squadron RAF from 23 May 1955 with the Gloster Meteor F.8 before being disbanded on 10 March 1957
 Bomber Command Central Night Vision School RAF
 RAF Central Vision Training School RAF
 Transport Command Central Vision Training School RAF

Current use
The site is currently used for farming with few remaining signs of the former airfield.

See also
 List of former Royal Air Force stations

References

Citations

Bibliography

Royal Air Force stations in Nottinghamshire
Royal Air Force stations of World War II in the United Kingdom